Minister for Police is a position in the government of Western Australia, currently held by Paul Papalia of the Labor Party. The position was first created in 1919, in the first ministry formed by James Mitchell, and has existed in almost every government since. The current minister is primarily responsible for the Western Australia Police, although past ministers held responsibilities now assigned to the Minister for Emergency Services and the Minister for Road Safety.

Between 2003 and 2008 (in the Labor governments of Geoff Gallop and Alan Carpenter) there was a separate minister titled Minister for Community Safety. Since 2008, the minister for police has also been the minister for road safety.

List of police ministers
Titles
 25 June 1919 – 5 June 1975: Minister for Police
 5 June 1975 – 25 January 1982: Minister for Police and Traffic
 25 January 1982 – 25 February 1983: Minister for Police
 25 February 1983 – 19 February 1990: Minister for Police and Emergency Services
 19 February 1990 – 1 July 2001: Minister for Police
 1 July 2001 – 23 September 2008: Minister for Police and Emergency Services
 23 September 2008 – present: Minister for Police

List of community safety ministers

See also
 Minister for Emergency Services (Western Australia)
 Minister for Road Safety (Western Australia)

References
 David Black (2014), The Western Australian Parliamentary Handbook (Twenty-Third Edition). Perth [W.A.]: Parliament of Western Australia.

Police
Minister for Police
Western Australia